Hans Nielsen Jeppesen (15 February 1815 – 8 October 1883) was a Danish merchant and ship-owner. He bought his first ship in 1850 and his fleet of merchant ships later grew to 10 ships. He was the maternal grandfather of Mærsk- founder Arnold Peter Møller.

Early life and career
Jeppesen was born on 15 February 1815  in Dragør, the son of Niels Taarnby Jeppesen and Marchen Hansdatter Møller. The family lived at Von Ostensgade 8. He went to sea in an early age and passed his exams as helmsman at the Navigation School in 1835 but did not have enough practical experience to work as a helmsman until 1838.

He began to work for Chr. Broberg & Søn in 1841 and was on 28 May 1842 granted citizenship in Copenhagen. He was captain on Chr. Broberg's schooner Thomas Lawrence in 1842–1751.

Ship-owner
Jeppesen's first ship, Elosabeth, commissioned from a shipyard in Kalmar in 1852, was already lost in 1855.. His second ship, Prima, was also commissioned directly from a shipyard. The rest of his ships were all used ships bought from other ship-owners. Only two of his ships, Coquette and Ellerslie, were owned in partnerships with others. By the 1870s, his fleet had grown to 10 shups.

Ships
This list may be incomplete

Personal life
 
Jeppesen was married to Leisebeth Jens Hansen Snedkers and the couple had seven daughters. His eldest daughter, Anna, married Peter Mærsk Møller. His youngest daughter, Nicoline, married Jacob Cornelius Isbrandtsen, and was the mother of Hans Isbrandtsen, New York.

The family lived at Elisenborg, a large property on the western outskirts of Dragør. Jeppesen died when a dinghy capsized off Dragør in 1883. He was at the time of his death the owner of eight ships. His widow closed the company down over the next one and a half years.

Further reading
 Hjorth, Birte (1989): Skibsreder H.N. Jeppesen fra Dragør, Dragør Lokalhistoriske Arkiv.

References

External links

 Hans Nielsen Jeppesen
 Source

19th-century Danish businesspeople
Danish businesspeople in shipping
People from Dragør Municipality
1815 births
1883 deaths